Shonto Preparatory School is a K–12 school system in Shonto, Arizona. The Shonto Preparatory School district includes a K–8 Bureau of Indian Affairs grant school and Shonto Preparatory Technology High School, a charter high school.

History
The Indian Affairs education facilities were founded in 1933 out of a local desire to have students attend a school closer to home. It moved to its current location in 1966. The Shonto Boarding School, as it was called, became a BIA/charter school in 1996, and the charter high school was added in 1997.

SPTHS Today
The current high school building was built in 2005–2006. It includes 16 classrooms, 2 vocational classrooms, and multi-purpose room known as the Cafetorium.

It has a boarding facility.

Departments
Departments of Shonto Preparatory Technology High School include:
 English
 Mathematics
 Science
 Social Studies
 Physical Education
 Art/Computer Graphics
 Diné Studies
 Career and Technical Education
 Exceptional Student Services (special education)

Staff
The Current Building staff consists of nine certified teachers, one per each department. The office has a student service technician, a registrar/administrative assistant, and a principal.

The school has 73 students. All of the students are Native American, and over 90% are eligible for free or reduced lunch programs.

Athletics
Shonto Preparatory Technology High School has a growing, competitive athletic program. The school competes as part of the Arizona Interscholastic Association in the 1A North Conference for basketball and volleyball and in Division IV for cross country, wrestling, and track and field.

Fall sports
 Cross Country
 Volleyball

Winter sports
 Basketball
 Wrestling

Spring sports
 Track and Field

References

External links
 

Boarding schools in Arizona
Public boarding schools in the United States
Public high schools in Arizona
Education on the Navajo Nation
Schools in Navajo County, Arizona
Charter schools in Arizona
Native American schools in Arizona
Education on the Navajo Nation